The Capital University of Science & Technology is a private university located in Islamabad, Pakistan. Established in 1998 under the banner of Muhammad Ali Jinnah University Islamabad Campus, the university offers undergraduate and post-graduate programs with a strong emphasis on business management, applied sciences, engineering and computer science. Starting March 29, 2022, the Office of Research, Innovation, and Commercialization (ORIC) of CUST will host a four-day hands-on workshop on "WordPress." The course will give you with the knowledge and skills you need to enhance your career as a Web Developer, land a better job/promotion, and raise your income through online employment and freelancing.

History 
The Punjab Group of Colleges has been serving the community with education since 1985. Punjab College of Commerce was the first institution to be established by the Group at Lahore. The Group is extending its network to several cities in the country.

Under the umbrella of the Punjab Group of Colleges, Punjab College of Business Administration and Punjab Institution of Computer Science have emerged as business and computer science institutions. Punjab Law College and Punjab College of Information Technology are also links in this chain of colleges.

As a tribute to the Father of the Nation, the group named its next ambitious project as Mohammad Ali Jinnah University. The university was granted its charter by the government of Sindh in 1998. The Islamabad campus was established after obtaining an NOC from UGC, dated 17 August 1998 and dated 29 November 2001 and NOC from HEC dated 27 September 2003.

In recognition of its services to education, the group has been awarded another charter by the government of Punjab to establish the University of Central Punjab.

Resource Academia was established in Islamabad after the success of the school in Lahore in 2003. The institution will provide education from preschool to grade VIII at the junior level and from O level to A level at the senior level. The aim of the group is to establish a nationwide network of schools.

The group has established institutions providing education from the pre-school level to the Ph.D. level. The campuses are located in the major cities of Pakistan.

Academics 
The university has departments of Computer Science, Bioinformatics and Biosciences, Mathematics, Pharmacy, Software Engineering in the Faculty of Computing and  Civil Engineering, Mechanical Engineering, Electrical Engineering in the Faculty of Engineering; in the Faculty of Business Administration and Social Sciences, there are departments of Business Administration, Economics and Social Sciences.

In addition to pure academic programs, the university runs training programs, seminars and workshops. The university has started doctoral programs in Computer Sciences, Mathematics, Bioinformatics, Civil Engineering, Mechanical Engineering, Electrical Engineering and Management Sciences.

Research groups and labs in Computer Science Department 
Center of Research in Networks and Telecommunications
Center of Research in Networks and Telecommunications fosters research and development activity in the rapidly growing field of networks and telecommunications.

Control and Signal Processing Research Group
Control and Signal Processing Research Group.

Vision and Pattern Recognition Research Group
Vision and Pattern Recognition Group is involved in basic and applied research in the fields of Image Processing, Machine/Computer Vision and Pattern Recognition/Classification.

ACME Center for Research in Wireless Communications
The mission of the ACME Center for Research in Wireless Communication is to conduct research in networking (core, wireless, sensors), mobile and pervasive computing, distributed and grid computing, cellular networks and social networks.

Center for Software Dependability
Center for Software Dependability is a research group founded in June 2003. The group has been working in diverse areas within the domain of Software Dependability, with focus on Software Reliability, Formal Methods, Model Driven Architecture and Software Testing.

Engineering Societies 
 American Society of Mechanical Engineers
 Institute of Electrical and Electronics Engineers
 American Society of Heating, Refrigerating and Air Conditioning Engineers
 Engineers Voice
 Hope-CUST Welfare Society
 Engineer's Forum
 Jinnah Engineering Society
 Energy and Environment

Gallery

See also
Punjab Group of Colleges
Punjab College of Business Administration
Punjab Law College
Mohammad Ali Jinnah University, Karachi
University of Central Punjab, Lahore

References

External links
 CUST official website

Universities and colleges in Islamabad
Private universities and colleges in Pakistan
Engineering universities and colleges in Pakistan
1998 establishments in Pakistan
Educational institutions established in 1998